Barbara Illingworth Brown was an American biochemist. She worked primarily at Washington University in St. Louis.

Education and career 
Brown was born in Hartford, Connecticut and later moved to Pennsylvania when her father's job in insurance moved the family. Brown graduated from Smith College in 1946. She worked with Jane Anne Russell at Yale University and received her PhD in physiological chemistry in 1950. Following her Ph.D., Brown applied to work with the Nobel Prize-winner Gerty Cori and became a Research Associate Professor of Biochemistry at Washington University in St. Louis and Established Investigator of the American Heart Association. She later also worked with Cori's husband and fellow Nobel Prize winner Carl Ferdinand Cori. She retired in 1989.

Brown served on the National Advisory General Medical Sciences Council at the National Institutes of Health from 1972 to 1974. She was awarded the Wilbur Cross Medal from Yale in 1983.

Research 
Her work was primarily devoted to the biochemistry of inherited metabolic diseases. She investigated the structure of glycogen and amylopectins, and defined the pathway and mechanisms of phosphorylase enzymes. Her research included the discovery of enzymes in a previously-unknown pathway to process glycogen. She went on to research diseases related to the storage of glycogen where these enzymes were absent. She applied some of Carl Cori's findings to medical cases, and confirmed the second known case of fructose bisphosphatase deficiency, a rare metabolic disorder, in 1970. She played a similar role in therapeutic research into glycogen storage disease type I.

Personal life 
Her husband, David H. Brown, was also a scientist and they collaborated on research on polysaccharide synthesis and glycogen storage diseases.

Selected publications

References

American women biochemists
1924 births
2016 deaths
Smith College alumni
Yale Graduate School of Arts and Sciences alumni
Washington University in St. Louis faculty